Lipice may refer to:

 Lipice, Croatia, a village in the region of Lika.
 Lipice, Poland, a village in west-central Poland.
 Lipice, Czech Republic, an area in the town of Pelhřimov.